Hugh McAleer (died 12 May 1941) was an Irish nationalist politician.

Born in Beragh, County Tyrone, McAleer worked as a teacher before being elected to Tyrone County Council.  He became the President of the Ancient Order of Hibernians in County Tyrone, and at the 1929 Northern Ireland general election, he was elected as the Nationalist Party MP for Mid Tyrone.  In 1935, he followed Alex Donnelly in withdrawing from Parliament, but he held his seat until his death in 1941.

References

Year of birth missing
1941 deaths
Irish schoolteachers
Members of Tyrone County Council
Members of the House of Commons of Northern Ireland 1929–1933
Members of the House of Commons of Northern Ireland 1933–1938
Members of the House of Commons of Northern Ireland 1938–1945
Nationalist Party (Ireland) members of the House of Commons of Northern Ireland
Members of the House of Commons of Northern Ireland for County Tyrone constituencies
Politicians from County Tyrone